Fonseca is a municipality located in the Colombian Department of La Guajira. The town celebrates the Festival del Retorno in honor of St Augustine with religious celebrations, vallenato music events and others.

Geography
The municipality is on a depression in the valley of the Ranchería River which flows through the municipality from west to east, between the Sierra Nevada de Santa Marta and the Serranía del Perijá.

Fonseca limits to the north with the municipality of Riohacha and Sierra Nevada de Santa Marta mountain range; to the south with the Bolivarian Republic of Venezuela and the Serranía del Perijá mountains; to the east with the municipality of Barrancas and to the west narrowly with the municipality of San Juan del Cesar.

The average temperature throughout the year is  varying only by altitude due to the mountainous environment. The municipality‘s climate ranges from hot semi-arid (Köppen BSh), as at the weather station of La Paulina, to tropical savanna (Aw) in wetter locations. There is a long though not intense wet season from April to November and a dry season from December to March with very little or no rain.

History
The area of Fonseca was inhabited by different indigenous groups; Chimila, Tupe, Wayuu, Cariachile people and Motilon.

There are two hypothesis about the foundation of Fonseca. One describes that by the year 1750 Catalan colonizer Agustín Fonseca and Italian José Agustín Parodi founded the village.

Agustín Fonseca was the leader of a group of adventurers who settled by the Ranchería river, but in a rainy season the river flooded the area bringing diseases. They moved to a dryer place on what is supposedly the present-day main plaza of Fonseca. José Agustín Parodi was a captain of the Spanish Crown and arrived by orders of the Spanish monarchy.

In 1773 the settlement of Fonseca was registered as jurisdiction of the Province of Santa Marta, only until 1967 La Guajira separated of Magdalena Department. On June 13, 1829 Fonseca became a municipality of the Intendencia of La Guajira by Decree 1954. Fonseca became a municipality of the Department of La Guajira in 1954.

Colombian armed conflict

Since the 1970s Barrancas has been influenced by the Colombian armed conflict because of its strategic location between the Sierra Nevada de Santa Marta, the Serranía del Perijá mountain ranges and the border with Venezuela. The Revolutionary Armed Forces of Colombia (FARC) through its Caribbean Bloc's 59th, 19th and 41st fronts and the National Liberation Army (ELN) guerrilla Gustavo Palmesano Front have practiced selective assassinations, kidnappings, extortions, forcedly recruitments, town sieges, arms and illegal drugs trafficking among others against the Colombian government and the civilian population.

The United Self-Defense Forces of Colombia (AUC) appeared in the area in the early 2000s led by alias Jorge 40. After a violent presence in the area but also dissipating the guerrillas presence, the AUC demobilized in 2006.

Politics

Administrative divisions

The municipality seat of Fonseca has some 32 neighborhoods mostly houses. The municipality also has three corregimientos; Conejo, El Hatico and Sitio Nuevo. Eight police inspections: Bangañitas, El Confuso, Los Altos, Sabaneta, Los Pondores, Cardonal, Trigo and Cañaboba. Some twenty veredas: El Porvenir, El Potrero, Jaguey, Puyalito, El Puy, Potrerito, Los Toquitos, Hatico Viejo, La Yaya, San Agustín, Puerto López, Las Bendiciones, Las Marimondas, Las Colonias, La Villa, Guamachal, Mamarongo, El Chorro and Mamonal. There is one indigenous reserve called Resguardo Indígena de Mayabangloma.

Demographics

Population data pertaining to the municipality of Fonseca from the year 2000 to 2004.

Culture

Fonseca celebrates the Festival del Retorno (Festival of the Return) every year in which people from Fonseca living in other towns, regions or countries are celebrated for their return to town.

References

External links
 Fonseca official website
 Gobernacion de La Guajira - Fonseca
 mifonseca.com - Festival del Retorno in Fonseca

Municipalities of La Guajira Department